The 2016 Bitburger Open Grand Prix Gold will be the 18th grand prix's badminton tournament of the 2016 BWF Grand Prix Gold and Grand Prix. The tournament will be held at Saarlandhalle Saarbrucken in Saarbrücken in the Germany 1–6 November 2016 and had a total purse of $120,000.

Men's singles

Seeds

  Hans-Kristian Vittinghus (withdrew)
  Rajiv Ouseph (withdrew)
  Marc Zwiebler (quarterfinals)
  Shi Yuqi (champion)
  Jonatan Christie (quarterfinals)
  Ihsan Maulana Mustofa (third round)
  Tanongsak Saensomboonsuk (withdrew)
  Hsu Jen-hao (first round)
  Boonsak Ponsana (withdrew)
  Huang Yuxiang (third round)
  Anthony Sinisuka Ginting (first round)
  Sameer Verma (semifinals)
  Emil Holst (first round)
  Xue Song (second round)
  Anders Antonsen (semifinals)
  Henri Hurskainen (second round)

Finals

Top half

Section 1

Section 2

Section 3

Section 4

Bottom half

Section 5

Section 6

Section 7

Section 8

Women's singles

Seeds

  He Bingjiao (champion)
  Porntip Buranaprasertsuk (semifinals)
  Busanan Ongbamrungphan (semifinals)
  Nitchaon Jindapol (final)
  Linda Zetchiri (first round)
  Beatriz Corrales (quarterfinals)
  Anna Thea Madsen (withdrew)
  Olga Konon (first round)

Finals

Top half

Section 1

Section 2

Bottom half

Section 3

Section 4

Men's doubles

Seeds

  Li Junhui / Liu Yuchen (withdrew)
  Mathias Boe / Carsten Mogensen (withdrew)
  Mads Conrad-Petersen / Mads Pieler Kolding (withdrew)
  Chen Hung-ling / Wang Chi-lin (semifinals)
  Marcus Ellis / Chris Langridge (first round)
  Kim Astrup / Anders Skaarup Rasmussen (semifinals)
  Bodin Issara / Nipitphon Puangpuapech (withdrew)
  Michael Fuchs / Johannes Schoettler (final)

Finals

Top half

Section 1

Section 2

Bottom half

Section 3

Section 4

Women's doubles

Seeds

  Chen Qingchen / Jia Yifan (champion)
  Jongkolphan Kititharakul / Rawinda Prajongjai (final)
  Maiken Fruergaard / Sara Thygesen (quarterfinals)
  Tiara Rosalia Nuraidah / Rizki Amelia Pradipta (semifinals)

Finals

Top half

Section 1

Section 2

Bottom half

Section 3

Section 4

Mixed doubles

Seeds

  Chris Adcock / Gabrielle Adcock (final)
  Zheng Siwei / Chen Qingchen (champion)
  Bodin Issara / Savitree Amitrapai (withdrew)
  Tan Kian Meng / Lai Pei Jing (semifinals)
  Terry Hee Yong Kai / Tan Wei Han (second round)
  Hafiz Faisal / Shella Devi Aulia (first round)
  Wang Yilu / Huang Dongping (quarterfinals)
  Sam Magee / Chloe Magee (quarterfinals)

Finals

Top half

Section 1

Section 2

Bottom half

Section 3

Section 4

References

External links
  Invitation | Internationale Bitburger-OPEN at www.bitburger-open.de

SaarLorLux Open
BWF Grand Prix Gold and Grand Prix
Bitburger Open Grand Prix Gold